Stronda Style is the first album by Bonde da Stronda, it was recorded between 2007-2008. The demo contains 16 tracks, contains some of the greatest hits of the group as "Nossa Química" and "Garota Diferente".

Track listing

Notes

 "Cara Metade" and "Conversas e fatos" were re-recorded, but only released as singles, without being part of another album.
 "Garota Diferente" and "Mar Playsson" were re-recorded and put on the album Nova Era da Stronda.
 "Nossa Química" is re-recorded numerous times in various versions, it was incorporated into the album Nova Era da Stronda and in the mixtape Corporação.

Personnel
 Mr. Thug - lead vocals, composition, production
 Léo Stronda - vocals, composition
 Mc Night - vocals

Sources
 http://letras.mus.br/bonde-da-stronda/cds.php
 https://web.archive.org/web/20131020120549/http://www.playssonlandia.com/2009/02/bonde-da-stronda-stronda-style-2008.html

2008 albums
Bonde da Stronda albums
Demo albums